The Holocaust Memorial and Tolerance Center of Nassau County (HMTC) is a Holocaust memorial, a museum and a tolerance center in Glen Cove, on the North Shore of Long Island in New York State. The museum and tolerance center is situated within the original Gold Coast Mansion "Welwyn", in what is now Welwyn Preserve County Park. The memorial also includes the adjoining garden, which was originally designed by the Olmsted Brothers, the influential American landscape architectural firm.

As of 2014, the museum is open on Mondays to Fridays from 10:00 am to 4:30 pm, and on Saturdays and Sundays from 12:00 pm to 6:00 pm.

History

Welwyn

The museum part of the memorial is housed in the estate's original Georgian-style mansion, "Welwyn", which was built in 1906, and which was designed by Delano & Aldrich. Welwyn was part of the estate of Harold Irving Pratt, an American oil industrialist and philanthropist who was born in 1877, and died at Glen Cove in 1939. Harold's wife, Harriet, left the Welwyn estate to Nassau County when she died in 1969. The mansion was neglected for approximately 30 years, during which time for a ten-year period it was used for training staff for the Nassau Sheriff's Department.

HMTC
In 1992, the Holocaust Memorial and Tolerance Center of Nassau County was founded by Boris Chartan, a Holocaust survivor, among others who were a part of a group then called the Holocaust Commission. Chartan's intention was not simply to teach the history of the Holocaust, but to educate people about the shortcomings of all kinds of hatred, prejudice, and intolerance, including antisemitism, racism, and bullying.

Chartan would serve as the museum's first chairman upon its opening in 1994. In 1996, the Louis Posner Memorial Library, Long Island’s most extensive collection of literature centered around the Holocaust, genocide, anti-discrimination and other forms of hate would open at the museum.

Harriet Pratt - a horticulturist - was an avid proponent of nature and preservation, championing the creation of the garden adjacent to the western side of the mansion as well as the installation of numerous greenhouses on the property. In the years following her death, the garden and surrounding grounds fell into disrepair, leading to overgrowth and decay. However, within years of the museum's opening, the once-magnificent butterfly garden was restored and eventually dedicated in 2003 to the over one million children murdered in the Holocaust.

References

External links
Official website

Holocaust museums in the United States
Museums in Nassau County, New York
History museums in New York (state)
Glen Cove, New York